With over 200 films to his credit, Lionel Banks (June 22, 1901 in Salt Lake City, Utah – March 20, 1950 in Los Angeles, California) was a hard-working art director from 1935 to 1949. In that time he worked on such films as Leo McCarey's The Awful Truth (1937), Howard Hawks' South American set Only Angels Have Wings (1939) and his rapid fire comedy classic the following year His Girl Friday, most of the Blondie B-movies, Alexander Hall's turn of the century fantasy Here Comes Mr. Jordan (1941) and Charles Vidor's lush Chopin biopic, A Song to Remember in 1945.

Banks was nominated for an Oscar seven times, for Holiday (1938), Mr. Smith Goes to Washington (1939), Arizona (1940), Ladies in Retirement (1941), The Talk of the Town (1942), Address Unknown and Cover Girl (both 1944), but never won.

Selected filmography
 The Best Man Wins (1935)
 Murder in Greenwich Village (1937)
 Stand By All Networks (1942)
 Two Señoritas from Chicago (1943)
 Louisiana Hayride (1944)

External links

American art directors
1901 births
Artists from Salt Lake City
1950 deaths